KZZZ (1490 AM) is a radio station broadcasting a News Talk Information format. Licensed to Bullhead City, Arizona, United States. The station is currently owned by Cameron Broadcasting and features programming from Fox News, Talk Radio Network and Premiere Radio Networks.  The station airs Gary Sheler, The Howler, Rush Limbaugh, Glenn Beck, Laura Ingraham, Mike Gallagher, Coast to Coast AM, Alan Colmes, Dr. Don Wagner, and Kim Komando weekends on information technology.

History

The station was assigned the call letters KBAS on May 8, 1981. On June 21, 2000, the station changed its call sign to the current KZZZ. In 2000, the station was changed from adult standards station "K-Star" to the current news-talk format. "K-Star" was moved to 1000 kHz and now has the calls KFLG.

References

External links
 cameronbroadcasting.com
 FCC History Cards for KZZZ

 
 

ZZZ
ZZZ
News and talk radio stations in the United States
Radio stations established in 1981